USS Energy (AMc-78) was an Accentor-class minesweeper acquired by the U.S. Navy for the dangerous task of removing mines from minefields laid in the water to prevent ships from passing.

Energy was launched 20 September 1941 by W. A. Robinson, Inc., of Ipswich, Massachusetts; sponsored by Mrs. E. Benedix; and commissioned 1 January 1942.

World War II service 

After conducting tests at the Mine Warfare School at Yorktown, Virginia, Energy arrived at St. George’s, Bermuda 24 March 1942, for sweeping duty until 20 October, when she sailed for Boston, Massachusetts.

Decommissioned and reassigned as YDT-3 

Here she was decommissioned 9 November 1942, and given "in-service" status. She became YDT-3 in July 1946 and continued to serve with the 1st Naval District. She was reported sold in 1960.

References

External links 
 NavSource Online: Mine Warfare Vessel Photo Archive - YDT-3 - ex-Energy (AMc 78)

Accentor-class minesweepers
World War II mine warfare vessels of the United States
Ships built in Ipswich, Massachusetts
1941 ships